Mount Martin is a rural locality in the Mackay Region, Queensland, Australia. In the  Mount Martin had a population of 186 people.

Geography
The predominant land use is growing sugarcane with some grazing on native vegetation. There is a network of cane tramways to deliver the harvested sugarcane to the sugar mills for processing.

History
Mount Martin Provisional School  opened in May 1906. On 1 January 1909 it became Mount Martin State School. It closed on 31 December 1961.

In the 2011 census, Mount Martin had a population of 306 people.

In the  Mount Martin had a population of 186 people.

Heritage listings
Mount Martin has a number of heritage-listed sites, including:
 Mirani-Mount Ossa Road: Mount Martin Cane Lift

Education
There are no schools in Mount Martin. The nearest primary schools are Mirani State School in neighbouring Mirani to the south-east and Gargett State School in Gargett to the south-west. The nearest secondary school is Mirani State High School in Mirani.

References

External links 

Towns in Queensland
Mackay Region
Localities in Queensland